Lucas Leonel Vera Piris (born 2 January 1994) is an Argentine professional footballer who plays as a midfielder for Argentino.

Club career
Lanús were Vera Piris' first career club, who he began appearing featuring for in 2013. He was initially an unused substitute four times in the Argentine Primera División, prior to making his senior debut in a Copa Argentina tie with UAI Urquiza on 21 March. In August 2014, Vera Piris joined fellow top-flight team Olimpo. He departed in 2015, having made just one appearance. 2016 saw Defensa y Justicia sign Vera Piris, though his spell with them lasted six months after he agreed to join Primera B Nacional's Crucero del Norte. Twenty-three appearances followed during 2016–17 as they were relegated to Primera B Metropolitana.

On 11 August 2017, Comunicaciones of Primera B Metropolitana completed the signing of Vera Piris. He scored his first career goal in his Comunicaciones debut, netting the opening goal of a 0–2 victory against Estudiantes. He subsequently scored three more goals in thirty-two fixtures for them in his first season. After five goals and fifty-five appearances across two seasons, subsequent moves to Unión Sunchales and Argentino followed across 2019 and 2020.

International career
Vera Piris was selected by the Argentina U17s for the 2011 FIFA U-17 World Cup in Mexico. He featured in group matches against Jamaica and Japan as Argentina were knocked out by England at the first knockout round. He had previously played for the Argentina U15s.

Career statistics
.

References

External links

1994 births
Living people
Sportspeople from Lanús
Argentine footballers
Argentina youth international footballers
Association football midfielders
Argentine Primera División players
Primera Nacional players
Primera B Metropolitana players
Torneo Federal A players
Club Atlético Lanús footballers
Olimpo footballers
Defensa y Justicia footballers
Crucero del Norte footballers
Club Comunicaciones footballers
Unión de Sunchales footballers
Argentino de Quilmes players